These 510 species belong to Nebria, a genus of ground beetles in the family Carabidae.

Nebria species

 Nebria aborana Andrewes, 1925
 Nebria acuta Lindroth, 1961
 Nebria adjarica Shilenkov, 1983
 Nebria aenea Gebler, 1825
 Nebria aetolica Apfelbeck, 1901
 Nebria agilis Ledoux & Roux, 1996
 Nebria alpicola (Motschulsky, 1866)
 Nebria altitudinis (Ledoux & Roux, 1996)
 Nebria amabilis Ledoux; Roux & Sawada, 1991
 Nebria ambigua Glasunov, 1902
 Nebria andalusia Rambur, 1837
 Nebria andarensis Bolivar y Pieltain, 1923
 Nebria angustata Dejean, 1831
 Nebria angusticollis (Bonelli, 1810)
 Nebria angustula Motschulsky, 1866
 Nebria anonyma (Ledoux & Roux, 1995)
 Nebria appalachia Darlington, 1932
 Nebria apuana Busi & Rivalta, 1980
 Nebria araschinica Reitter, 1892
 Nebria arcensis Ledoux & Roux, 1990
 Nebria archastoides Ledoux & Roux, 1997
 Nebria arinae Dudko & Shilenkov, 2001
 Nebria arkansana Casey, 1913
 Nebria armata Ledoux & Roux, 1999
 Nebria asahina Sasakawa, 2009
 Nebria assidua C.Huber & J.Schmidt, 2009
 Nebria asturiensis Bruneau de Miré, 1964
 Nebria atlantica Oberthür, 1883
 Nebria atrata Dejean, 1826
 Nebria attemsi Apfelbeck, 1908
 Nebria augustini Ledoux & Roux, 2000
 Nebria austriaca Ganglbauer, 1889
 Nebria azarbayanei Muilwijk, 2015
 Nebria baenningeri Dudko & Shilenkov, 2001
 Nebria baicalica Motschulsky, 1844
 Nebria baicalopacifica Dudko & Shilenkov, 2006
 Nebria banksi Crotch, 1871
 Nebria barbata Andrewes, 1929
 Nebria bargusinica Shilenkov, 1999
 Nebria baumanni Kavanaugh, 2015
 Nebria bellorum Kavanaugh, 1979
 Nebria belloti Franz, 1954
 Nebria berezovskii (Shilenkov, 1984)
 Nebria biseriata Lutshnik, 1915
 Nebria bissenica E.A.Bielz, 1887
 Nebria bluemlisalpicola (Szallies & C.Huber, 2014)
 Nebria bodpaica Ledoux & Roux, 1998
 Nebria boiteli Alluaud, 1932
 Nebria bonellii (M.Adams, 1817)
 Nebria boschi (Winkler in Horion, 1949)
 Nebria bosnica Ganglbauer, 1889
 Nebria boulbeni (Ledoux & Roux, 1998)
 Nebria bousqueti Ledoux, 1993
 Nebria bowashanensis Janata & Mikyska, 2009
 Nebria bremii Germar, 1831
 Nebria brevicollis (Fabricius, 1792)
 Nebria businskyorum Ledoux & Roux, 1997
 Nebria calva Kavanaugh, 1984
 Nebria cameroni Andrewes, 1925
 Nebria capillosa Ledoux & Roux, 1992
 Nebria carbonaria Eschscholtz, 1829
 Nebria carpathica E.A.Bielz, 1850
 Nebria carri Kavanaugh, 1979
 Nebria casalei Giachino, 2013
 Nebria castanea (Bonelli, 1810)
 Nebria catenata Casey, 1913
 Nebria catenulata Fischer von Waldheim, 1820
 Nebria cathaica Sciaky & Pavesi, 1994
 Nebria caucasica Ménétriés, 1832
 Nebria cavazzutii Ledoux & Roux, 2005
 Nebria celata Ledoux & Roux, 1999
 Nebria cenobita (Ledoux & Roux, 1999)
 Nebria charlottae Lindroth, 1961
 Nebria chaslii Fairmaire, 1886
 Nebria chelmosensis Maran, 1944
 Nebria chichibuensis Sasakawa, 2010
 Nebria chinensis Bates, 1872
 Nebria chitralensis Shilenkov & Heinz, 1988
 Nebria christinae C.Huber & J.Schmidt, 2007
 Nebria chugokuensis Sasakawa, 2020
 Nebria cinctella Andrewes, 1925
 Nebria civilis Ledoux & Roux, 1998
 Nebria coiffaiti Ledoux, 1983
 Nebria coloradensis Van Dyke, 1943
 Nebria commixta Chaudoir, 1850
 Nebria compacta Ledoux & Roux, 1999
 Nebria complanata (Linnaeus, 1767)
 Nebria composita Ledoux & Roux, 1993
 Nebria conjuncta Ledoux & Roux, 1996
 Nebria cordicollis Chaudoir, 1837
 Nebria coreica Solsky, 1875
 Nebria corpulenta (Ledoux & Roux, 2009)
 Nebria coruscans Ledoux & Roux, 2005
 Nebria crassicornis Van Dyke, 1925
 Nebria crenatostriata Bassi, 1834
 Nebria currax Wollaston, 1864
 Nebria cursitans Ledoux & Roux, 1998
 Nebria dacatrai Ledoux & Roux, 1996
 Nebria dahlii (Duftschmid, 1812)
 Nebria daisetsuzana Ueno, 1952
 Nebria danmanni Kavanaugh, 1981
 Nebria darlingtoni Kavanaugh, 1979  (South Forks ground beetle)
 Nebria davatchii Morvan, 1974
 Nebria dejeanii Dejean, 1826
 Nebria dekraatzi Oberthür, 1883
 Nebria delectabilis Ledoux & Roux, 1995
 Nebria delicata C.Huber & J.Schmidt, 2017
 Nebria delineata Ledoux & Roux, 1998
 Nebria desgodinsi Oberthür, 1883
 Nebria desolata Kavanaugh, 1971
 Nebria deuvei (Ledoux & Roux, 1989)
 Nebria deuveiana Ledoux & Roux, 1990
 Nebria diaphana K. & J.Daniel, 1890
 Nebria dichotoma Sasakawa, 2020
 Nebria dilatata Dejean, 1831
 Nebria diversa LeConte, 1863
 Nebria djakonovi Semenov & Znojko, 1928
 Nebria dolicapax Ledoux & Roux, 1992
 Nebria dubitata (Ledoux & Roux, 2012)
 Nebria elbursiaca Bodemeyer, 1927
 Nebria elegans Andrewes, 1925
 Nebria elliptipennis Bates, 1874
 Nebria eschscholtzii Ménétriés, 1843
 Nebria eugeniae K.Daniel, 1903
 Nebria expansicollis (Ledoux, 1989)
 Nebria explanata (Ledoux & Roux, 1995)
 Nebria exul Peyerimhoff, 1910
 Nebria fageticola C.Huber & Marggi, 2009
 Nebria fairmairei Ledoux & Roux, 1992
 Nebria faldermanni Ménétriés, 1832
 Nebria fallaciosa Ledoux & Roux, 1992
 Nebria fasciatopunctata L.Miller, 1850
 Nebria femoralis Chaudoir, 1843
 Nebria ferganensis Shilenkov, 1982
 Nebria finissima Ledoux & Roux, 1990
 Nebria fischeri Faldermann, 1836
 Nebria flexuosa Ledoux & Roux, 1995
 Nebria fongondi Ledoux, 1981
 Nebria fontinalis K. & J.Daniel, 1890
 Nebria formosana Habu, 1972
 Nebria frigida R.F.Sahlberg, 1844
 Nebria fulgida Gebler, 1847
 Nebria fulviventris Bassi, 1834
 Nebria funerea Ledoux & Roux, 1992
 Nebria furcata Sasakawa, 2020
 Nebria fuscipes Fuss, 1849
 Nebria gagates (Bonelli, 1810)
 Nebria ganeshi Ledoux, 1984
 Nebria ganglbaueri Apfelbeck, 1905
 Nebria gansuensis (Ledoux & Roux, 1998)
 Nebria gebleri Dejean, 1831
 Nebria gemina Ledoux; Roux & Wrase, 1996
 Nebria genei Gené, 1839
 Nebria georgei Kavanaugh, 2006
 Nebria georgesi Roux & Wrase, 2007
 Nebria germarii Heer, 1837
 Nebria giachinoi (Ledoux & Roux, 2012)
 Nebria gibbulosa Motschulsky, 1860
 Nebria giulianii Kavanaugh, 1981
 Nebria glabra (Ledoux & Roux, 1995)
 Nebria glacicola Ledoux & Roux, 2001
 Nebria globulosa Ledoux & Roux, 1996
 Nebria gosteliae C.Huber, 2010
 Nebria gotschii Chaudoir, 1846
 Nebria gouleti Kavanaugh, 1979
 Nebria gratiosa Ledoux & Roux, 1998
 Nebria gregaria Fischer von Waldheim, 1820
 Nebria grombczewskii Semenov, 1891
 Nebria grumi Glasunov, 1902
 Nebria guttulata Ledoux & Roux, 2000
 Nebria haberhaueri Heyden, 1889
 Nebria haeckeli (Farkac, 1995)
 Nebria haida Kavanaugh, 1984
 Nebria hajeki (Ledoux & Roux, 2009)
 Nebria heegeri Dejean, 1826
 Nebria heeri K.Daniel, 1903
 Nebria heishuiensis Ledoux & Roux, 2008
 Nebria helianta Ledoux & Roux, 2001
 Nebria hellwigii (Panzer, 1802)
 Nebria hemprichi Klug, 1832
 Nebria heydenii Dejean, 1831
 Nebria hiekei Shilenkov, 1982
 Nebria hiekeiana C.Huber & Baur, 2016
 Nebria himalayica Bates, 1889
 Nebria hollandei Ledoux & Roux, 1993
 Nebria holtzi K.Daniel, 1903
 Nebria holzunensis Dudko & Shilenkov, 2006
 Nebria hudsonica LeConte, 1863
 Nebria hwangtienyuni (Shilenkov & Kryzhanovskij, 1983)
 Nebria hybrida Rottenberg, 1874
 Nebria iidesana Sasakawa, 2020
 Nebria impunctata C.Huber & J.Schmidt, 2017
 Nebria incarinata C.Huber & J.Schmidt, 2017
 Nebria incidata (Ledoux & Roux, 1995)
 Nebria incognita C.Huber & Baur, 2016
 Nebria inexpectata Ledoux & Roux, 2006
 Nebria ingens G.Horn, 1870
 Nebria irregularis Jedlicka, 1965
 Nebria irrorata Ledoux & Roux, 1995
 Nebria jakuchisana Sasakawa, 2009
 Nebria janfarkaci (Ledoux & Roux, 1997)
 Nebria janschneideri Ledoux & Roux, 1999
 Nebria jarrigei Ledoux & Roux, 1991
 Nebria jeffreyi Kavanaugh, 1984
 Nebria jockischii Sturm, 1815
 Nebria jugosa Ledoux & Roux, 1998
 Nebria kabakovi Shilenkov, 1982
 Nebria kagmara C.Huber & J.Schmidt, 2017
 Nebria kaszabi Shilenkov, 1982
 Nebria kerzhneri Shilenkov, 1982
 Nebria kincaidi Schwarz, 1900
 Nebria kirgisica Shilenkov, 1982
 Nebria kiso Sasakawa, 2009
 Nebria klapperichi Bänninger, 1956
 Nebria kocheri Verdier, 1953
 Nebria komarovi Semenov & Znojko, 1928
 Nebria korgei Jedlicka, 1965
 Nebria kratteri Dejean, 1831
 Nebria kryzhanovskii Shilenkov, 1982
 Nebria kubaniana Ledoux & Roux, 1998
 Nebria kumgangi Shilenkov, 1983
 Nebria kuragadakensis Sasakawa, 2020
 Nebria kurentzovi Lafer, 1989
 Nebria kurosawai Nakane, 1960
 Nebria kyanjinica C.Huber & J.Schmidt, 2018
 Nebria labontei Kavanaugh, 1984
 Nebria lacustris Casey, 1913
 Nebria laevistriata Ledoux & Roux, 1998
 Nebria lafresnayei Audinet-Serville, 1821
 Nebria lamarckensis Kavanaugh, 1979
 Nebria lamarckiana (Ledoux & Roux, 2009)
 Nebria lareynii Fairmaire, 1858
 Nebria lariollei Germiny, 1865
 Nebria laticollis Dejean, 1826
 Nebria latior Ledoux & Roux, 1992
 Nebria ledouxi Roux, 2021
 Nebria lenis Ledoux & Roux, 1995
 Nebria leonensis Assmann; Wrase & Zaballos, 2000
 Nebria lewisi Bates, 1874
 Nebria lhachenica C.Huber & J.Schmidt, 2018
 Nebria liae Ledoux & Roux, 2007
 Nebria ligurica K.Daniel, 1903
 Nebria limbigera Solsky, 1874
 Nebria lingulata Janata & Mikyska, 2009
 Nebria lituyae Kavanaugh, 1979
 Nebria livida (Linnaeus, 1758)
 Nebria loebliana C.Huber & J.Schmidt, 2018
 Nebria lombarda K. & J.Daniel, 1890
 Nebria longilingua Ledoux & Roux, 1991
 Nebria louiseae Kavanaugh, 1984
 Nebria lucidissima Sciaky & Pavesi, 1994
 Nebria lucifer Ledoux & Roux, 1998
 Nebria lyelli Van Dyke, 1925
 Nebria lyubechanskii Dudko, 2008
 Nebria macedonica Maran, 1938
 Nebria macrodera K.Daniel, 1903
 Nebria macrogona Bates, 1873
 Nebria mandibularis Bates, 1872
 Nebria mannerheimii Fischer von Waldheim, 1828
 Nebria marginata Ledoux & Roux, 1995
 Nebria martensi C.Huber & J.Schmidt, 2012
 Nebria masrina Andrewes, 1924
 Nebria mathildae Ledoux & Roux, 2001
 Nebria meanyi Van Dyke, 1925
 Nebria medvedevi Shilenkov, 1982
 Nebria megalops C.Huber & Geiser, 2012
 Nebria meissonnieri Ledoux & Roux, 2008
 Nebria mellyi Gebler, 1847
 Nebria memorabilis Ledoux & Roux, 1992
 Nebria mentoincisa C.Huber & J.Schmidt, 2013
 Nebria merditana Apfelbeck, 1906
 Nebria metallica Fischer von Waldheim, 1820
 Nebria meurguesae Ledoux, 1985
 Nebria micans Ledoux & Roux, 1998
 Nebria microphthalma Ledoux & Roux, 1998
 Nebria micropora (Ledoux & Roux, 1998)
 Nebria mikawa Sasakawa, 2009
 Nebria mingyii Ledoux & Roux, 2014
 Nebria mirabilis Ledoux & Roux, 1990
 Nebria mirkae Janata & Mikyska, 2009
 Nebria mniszechii Chaudoir, 1854
 Nebria molendai C.Huber & J.Schmidt, 2007
 Nebria mondini Sciaky; Magrini & Mondin, 2020
 Nebria montisanimae C.Huber & J.Schmidt, 2017
 Nebria morula K. & J.Daniel, 1891
 Nebria morvani Ledoux & Roux, 1999
 Nebria motschulskyi Chaudoir, 1846
 Nebria mucronata Ledoux & Roux, 1999
 Nebria murzini Ledoux & Roux, 2000
 Nebria nakanei Ueno, 1953
 Nebria nana Ledoux & Roux, 1996
 Nebria nanshanica Shilenkov, 1982
 Nebria nasuensis Sasakawa, 2009
 Nebria nataliae Kabak & Putchkov, 1996
 Nebria navajo Kavanaugh, 1979
 Nebria neglecta Ledoux & Roux, 2008
 Nebria negrei Ledoux & Roux, 1992
 Nebria nicolasi Ledoux & Roux, 2006
 Nebria nigerrima Chaudoir, 1846
 Nebria nigrescens (Ledoux & Roux, 1995)
 Nebria nigricans Ledoux & Roux, 2000
 Nebria niitakana Kano, 1930
 Nebria niohozana Bates, 1883
 Nebria nivalis (Paykull, 1790)
 Nebria nouristanensis Ledoux, 1985
 Nebria nudicollis Peyerimhoff, 1911
 Nebria numburica C.Huber & J.Schmidt, 2017
 Nebria oberthuri Ledoux & Roux, 1991
 Nebria obliqua LeConte, 1867
 Nebria obscura Ledoux & Roux, 2012
 Nebria ochotica R.F.Sahlberg, 1844
 Nebria olivieri Dejean, 1826
 Nebria olympica Maran, 1938
 Nebria oramarensis Shilenkov & Heinz, 1984
 Nebria orbiculata (Ledoux & Roux, 1998)
 Nebria orestias Andrewes, 1932
 Nebria orientalis Bänninger, 1949
 Nebria orsinii A. & G.B.Villa, 1839
 Nebria ovipennis LeConte, 1878
 Nebria oxyptera K.Daniel in K. & J.Daniel, 1904
 Nebria pallipes Say, 1823
 Nebria panshiri Ledoux & Roux, 1997
 Nebria paradisi Darlington, 1931
 Nebria paropamisos C.Huber; J.Schmidt & Baur, 2013
 Nebria parvulissima Ledoux & Roux, 1998
 Nebria pashupatii C.Huber & J.Schmidt, 2018
 Nebria patruelis Chaudoir, 1846
 Nebria pawlowskii Shilenkov, 1983
 Nebria pazi Seidlitz, 1867
 Nebria pektusanica Horvatovich, 1973
 Nebria pennisii Magrini, 1987
 Nebria perlonga Heyden, 1885
 Nebria persimilis Ledoux & Roux, 2012
 Nebria pertinax C.Huber & J.Schmidt, 2009
 Nebria peyerimhoffi Alluaud, 1923
 Nebria pharina Andrewes, 1929
 Nebria picea Dejean, 1826
 Nebria picicornis (Fabricius, 1792)
 Nebria picta Semenov, 1891
 Nebria pictiventris Fauvel, 1888
 Nebria pilipila Ledoux & Roux, 2006
 Nebria pindarica Andrewes, 1925
 Nebria piperi Van Dyke, 1925
 Nebria pisciformis Sasakawa, 2020
 Nebria piute Erwin & Ball, 1972
 Nebria plagiata Bänninger, 1923
 Nebria plicata Ledoux & Roux, 1992
 Nebria polita Ledoux, 1989
 Nebria politissima (Ledoux & Roux, 2012)
 Nebria pontica Ledoux & Roux, 1990
 Nebria poplii Ledoux, 1984
 Nebria posthuma K. & J.Daniel, 1891
 Nebria praedicta Kavanaugh & Schoville, 2009
 Nebria praelonga Ledoux, 1985
 Nebria producta (Ledoux & Roux, 2009)
 Nebria przewalskii Semenov, 1889
 Nebria psammodes (P.Rossi, 1792)
 Nebria psammophila Solsky, 1874
 Nebria pseudorestias C.Huber & J.Schmidt, 2017
 Nebria puella Ledoux & Roux, 1998
 Nebria pulcherrima Bates, 1873
 Nebria pulchrior Maindron, 1906
 Nebria punctatostriata L.Schaufuss, 1876
 Nebria purkynei (Jedlicka, 1946)
 Nebria purpurata LeConte, 1878
 Nebria quezeli Verdier, 1953
 Nebria quinquelobata Sasakawa, 2016
 Nebria raetzeri Bänninger, 1932
 Nebria rasa Andrewes, 1936
 Nebria reflexa Bates, 1883
 Nebria reichii Dejean, 1826
 Nebria reitteri Rybinski, 1902
 Nebria restricta Ledoux & Roux, 2005
 Nebria retingensis C.Huber & J.Schmidt, 2017
 Nebria retrospinosa Heyden, 1885
 Nebria reymondi Antoine, 1951
 Nebria rhilensis J.Frivaldszky, 1879
 Nebria roborowskii Semenov, 1889
 Nebria roddi Dudko & Shilenkov, 2001
 Nebria rotundata (Ledoux, 1989)
 Nebria rotundicollis Heinz & Ledoux, 1990
 Nebria rougemonti Ledoux & Roux, 1988
 Nebria rousseleti Ledoux & Roux, 1988
 Nebria rubicunda (Quensel, 1806)
 Nebria rubostipes C.Huber & J.Schmidt, 2017
 Nebria rubripes Audinet-Serville, 1821
 Nebria rubrofemorata Shilenkov, 1975
 Nebria rufescens (Ström, 1768)
 Nebria rupina C.Huber & J.Schmidt, 2017
 Nebria sadona Bates, 1883
 Nebria saeviens Bates, 1883
 Nebria sagittata Sasakawa, 2020
 Nebria sahlbergii Fischer von Waldheim, 1828
 Nebria sajana Dudko & Shilenkov, 2001
 Nebria sajanica Bänninger, 1932
 Nebria salina Fairmaire & Laboulbène, 1854
 Nebria saurica Shilenkov, 1976
 Nebria scaphelytra Kavanaugh & Shilenkov, 1996
 Nebria schawalleri Shilenkov, 1998
 Nebria schlegelmilchi (M.Adams, 1817)
 Nebria schrenkii Gebler, 1843
 Nebria schusteri Ganglbauer, 1889
 Nebria schwarzi Van Dyke, 1925
 Nebria sciakyi Ledoux & Roux, 1996
 Nebria semenoviana Shilenkov, 1976
 Nebria serissima (Ledoux & Roux, 2009)
 Nebria setifera (Shilenkov, 1984)
 Nebria setosa Ledoux & Roux, 1995
 Nebria setulata Ledoux & Roux, 1995
 Nebria sevanensis Shilenkov, 1983
 Nebria shatanica Ledoux & Roux, 2005
 Nebria shibanaii Ueno, 1955
 Nebria shikokuensis Sasakawa, 2011
 Nebria sierrablancae Kavanaugh, 1984
 Nebria sifanica Semenov & Znojko, 1928
 Nebria similis (Ledoux & Roux, 2012)
 Nebria simplex Ledoux & Roux, 1996
 Nebria simulator Bänninger, 1933
 Nebria simulatoria Ledoux & Roux, 1993
 Nebria sitiens Antoine, 1937
 Nebria snowi Bates, 1883
 Nebria sobrina L.Schaufuss, 1862
 Nebria sochondensis Shilenkov, 1999
 Nebria solitaria (Ledoux & Roux, 1999)
 Nebria soror K.Daniel, 1903
 Nebria spatulata Van Dyke, 1925
 Nebria speiseri Ganglbauer, 1891
 Nebria sphaerithorax Ledoux & Roux, 1999
 Nebria spinosa Ledoux & Roux, 1995
 Nebria splendida Fischer von Waldheim, 1844
 Nebria stanislavi Dudko & Matalin, 2002
 Nebria steensensis Kavanaugh, 1984
 Nebria sterbai (Jedlicka, 1935)
 Nebria storkani Maran, 1939
 Nebria stricta Ledoux & Roux, 1991
 Nebria suavis Ledoux & Roux, 1996
 Nebria subaerea Breit, 1914
 Nebria subdilatata Motschulsky, 1844
 Nebria sublivida Semenov, 1889
 Nebria subquadrata (Ledoux & Roux, 1998)
 Nebria suensoni Shilenkov & Dostal, 1983
 Nebria superna Andrewes, 1923
 Nebria suturalis LeConte, 1850
 Nebria suvorovi Shilenkov, 1976
 Nebria sylvatica Kavanaugh, 1979
 Nebria talassica Shilenkov, 1982
 Nebria tangjelaensis Shilenkov, 1998
 Nebria tatrica L.Miller, 1859
 Nebria taygetana Rottenberg, 1874
 Nebria tekesensis Ledoux & Roux, 2005
 Nebria tenella Motschulsky, 1850
 Nebria tenuicaulis Sasakawa & Kubota, 2006
 Nebria tenuisulcata C.Huber & J.Schmidt, 2017
 Nebria testacea Olivier, 1811
 Nebria tetungi Shilenkov, 1982
 Nebria thierryi (Ledoux & Roux, 1995)
 Nebria thonitida Ledoux & Roux, 1990
 Nebria tiani Ledoux & Roux, 2003
 Nebria tibialis (Bonelli, 1810)
 Nebria torosa Ledoux; Roux & Sciaky, 1994
 Nebria transsylvanica Germar, 1823
 Nebria triangula (Ledoux & Roux, 1995)
 Nebria trifaria LeConte, 1878
 Nebria trifida Sasakawa, 2008
 Nebria triseriata C.Huber & J.Schmidt, 2017
 Nebria tristicula Reitter, 1888
 Nebria tronqueti (Ledoux & Roux, 1995)
 Nebria tsambagarov C.Huber & Schnitter, 2020
 Nebria tshatkalica Kabak & Shilenkov in Kabak, 2001
 Nebria tuberculata C.Huber & J.Schmidt, 2017
 Nebria turcica Chaudoir, 1843
 Nebria turmaduodecima Kavanaugh, 1981
 Nebria tyschkanica Kryzhanovskij & Shilenkov, 1976
 Nebria uenoi Nakane, 1963
 Nebria uenoiana Habu, 1972
 Nebria ultima Ledoux & Roux, 1998
 Nebria uluderensis Shilenkov & Heinz, 1984
 Nebria unguinosa Ledoux; Roux & Sciaky, 1994
 Nebria uralensis Glasunov, 1901
 Nebria urbionensis Arribas, 1991
 Nebria valida Ledoux & Roux, 1996
 Nebria vandykei Bänninger, 1928
 Nebria vanvolxemi Putzeys, 1874
 Nebria velebiticola Reitter, 1902
 Nebria verticalis Fischer von Waldheim, 1828
 Nebria vicina Ledoux & Roux, 1999
 Nebria viridipennis Reitter, 1885
 Nebria vladiae Ledoux & Roux, 2005
 Nebria vseteckai Maran, 1938
 Nebria vuillefroyi Chaudoir, 1866
 Nebria wallowae Kavanaugh, 1984
 Nebria walterheinzi Ledoux & Roux, 1990
 Nebria wraseiana Ledoux & Roux, 1996
 Nebria wutaishanensis Shilenkov & Dostal, 1983
 Nebria xanthacra Chaudoir, 1850
 Nebria xiangchengica Janata & Mikyska, 2009
 Nebria yatsugatakensis Sasakawa, 2016
 Nebria yuae (Ledoux & Roux, 1995)
 Nebria yunnana Bänninger, 1928
 Nebria zayula Andrewes, 1936
 Nebria zioni Van Dyke, 1943
 † Nebria abstracta Scudder, 1900
 † Nebria dobbertinensis Geinitz, 1894
 † Nebria fossilis Piton & Theobald, 1935
 † Nebria nitens Geinitz, 1894
 † Nebria occlusa Scudder, 1900
 † Nebria paleomelas Scudder, 1879
 † Nebria pluto Heer, 1862
 † Nebria scudderi Geinitz, 1894
 † Nebria trisiphone Oustalet, 1874

References

Lists of insect species